Dragonville is an unincorporated community in King and Queen County, Virginia, United States, named after the English hamlet of Dragonville, County Durham.

References

Unincorporated communities in Virginia
Unincorporated communities in King and Queen County, Virginia